The Israel Tax Authority is the taxation authority in Israel. It is an agency of the Ministry of Finance.

The Authority was established on 1 September 2004, following a decision by the Government of Israel to merge the tax collection divisions - the Income Tax and Real Estate Tax Department, the Customs and VAT Division and the Computerised Processing Service. The aim was "to consolidate the management of tax collection under one head manager and to authorize it by law to implement the relevant tax law". The authority employs about 5,500 people.

See also 
 Taxation in Israel

References

External links  
 

Government agencies of Israel
Revenue services